The Panaviska Recreation Area is located on the bench of Panasivka mountain stream between villages of Korostiv and Kozova in Stryi Raion. This is on the 666-kilometer along the highway  Kyiv-Chop.

It is a favorite spot as residents of the area and the car tourists. Back in the 1880 there were building recreation centers for children. On the territory of rest has gazebos, tables with benches, parking.

Also, there had once been famous "Guta Korostivska", wherein worked 140 people. "Guta Korostivska" was once famous for its of glass products throughout Europe.

Gallery

References

External links 
 Історія Сколівщини, Сторінка 2 з 4 
 Національний природний парк „Сколівські Бескиди” 

Protected areas of Ukraine
Stryi Raion